The Apauwar River is a river in Western New Guinea.

See also
List of rivers of Western New Guinea
Apauwar River languages

References

Rivers of Papua (province)